Greece was the host nation of the 1896 Summer Olympics held in Athens.  The number of Greek contestants is commonly cited as 169, but as many as 176 Greeks contested events in all nine sports.  The Greeks were by far the most successful nation in terms of total medals with 47, 27 more than the United States of America.  Nevertheless, their number of first-place finishes (10) was one fewer than the Americans' 11.  The Greeks had 172 entries in 39 events.  Only 4 events had no Greek entrants—the 400 metres and the high jump in athletics and the vault and the team horizontal bar in gymnastics.

Medalists

Multiple medalists
The following competitors won multiple medals at the 1896 Olympic Games.

Competitors

| width=78% align=left valign=top |
The following is the list of number of competitors in the Games.

| width="22%" align="left" valign="top" |

Athletics

The Greeks entered every event on the athletics program save the 400 metres and the high jump.  They took 1 gold, 3 silver, and 6 bronze medals in the sport. It was initially thought that the Greek team had swept the top three places of the marathon event, until it was discovered that Spiridon Belokas had covered part of the distance by cart and was disqualified.

Track & road events

Field events

Cycling

Greece had entries in all six cycling events, winning one and taking second place in three more.

Track

Road

Fencing

Greek fencers won the top two places in the sabre competition, third place in the amateur foil competition, and in a major upset, Pyrgos defeated Joanni Perronet in the sole match of the masters foil event.

Gymnastics

The names of the members of the two teams that competed in the team events are, for the most part, unknown.  The vault and the team horizontal bar were two of the four events (the other two in the athletics program) that had no Greek entrants.  The Greeks took two of each color medal, with two medals in each of the rope climbing (gold and silver), rings (gold and bronze), and team parallel bars (silver and bronze) competitions.

Team

Individual

Shooting

Greek shooters dominated the two rifle events and the rapid fire pistol competition, but were largely unable to compete with the Paine brothers of the United States in the pistol events that the two brothers entered.

Swimming

Some of the Greek swimmers' names were not recorded. Greece's only swimming gold medal came in an event in which only Greek swimmers were allowed to compete, as did a silver and a bronze. In the three open events, the Greeks took two silvers and one bronze, all in the two longer races.

Tennis

Greece earned a silver medal and a bronze medal in the singles tournament.  Kasdaglis and Petrokokkinos won a silver medal in doubles tournament.

Weightlifting

In the one handed event, weightlifters had to lift with each hand successively.  Nikolopoulos was able to list 57 kilograms with one hand, but only 40 kilograms with the other.  He was judged to have come in third place in the event between the silver medallist Viggo Jensen who had lifted 57 with each hand and 4th-place finisher Versis who had lifted 40 with each, but had not been able to lift 57 with either.

Lifting form was used to break ties in the two handed competition.

Wrestling

Christopoulos won a battle of endurance against Momcsilló Tapavicza in the quarterfinals of the wrestling tournament.  He then had to face Tsitas, who had received a bye in that round.  Tsitas won, giving Christopoulos the bronze medal and a shoulder injury.  Tsitas then faced Carl Schuhmann in the final.  Schuhmann, having had a bye in the semifinals, took two days to defeat Tsitas, the match having to be postponed on account of darkness at the end of 40 minutes in the first day.

Notes

References

  (Digitally available at )
  (Excerpt available at )
 

Nations at the 1896 Summer Olympics
1896
Olympics